Élodie La Villette, born Elodie Jacquier (April 12, 1848 Strasbourg (Bas-Rhin) – 1917 Saint-Pierre-Quiberon), was a French painter. She is said to be one of the few women to have an artistic career when many routes were denied to them.

Life 
Elodie/Ella La Villette was born in 1848 to an army doctor and his wife. They moved frequently and her younger sister, Caroline, was born four years later.

During the 1860s, the two sisters, Ella and Caroline Jacquier, took drawing classes with the painter Ernest Coroller at the Lycée Dupuy-de-Lôme. This influenced both their careers, since they both became painters, known under the respective names of Elodie La Villette and Caroline Espinet (1844-1912). She married in 1860, and her sister followed suit in 1868. They painted together. This was not a mere hobby, as they exhibited their work. 

She had a painting accepted by the Salon in 1870 and was awarded a third class medal in 1875. The following year her painting "La grève de Lohic et de l'île de la Souris près de Lorient" was bought by the Musée d'Orsay. Her painting won a bronze medal at the Universal Exhibition of 1889. La Villette exhibited her work at the Palace of Fine Arts and The Woman's Building at the 1893 World's Columbian Exposition in Chicago, Illinois.

Élodie La Villette, who received the advice of Jean-Baptiste Corot in 1874, carries off "marine art" sensitive to light effects which are reminiscent of both Courbet's realism and the virtuosity of Boudin".

Exhibitions 
 In 1991, she was the artist of honor of the fair organized by the Lorient Society of Fine Arts, and had a retrospective tribute in 2007.
 In 2014, the Museum of Fine Arts Morlaix devoted its summer exhibition to the two sisters, Elodie La Villette and Caroline Espinet.

Works 

 Marine, Musée d'art moderne et contemporain de Strasbourg
 La falaise d'Hyport, Musée des beaux-arts de Lille
 Marine, temps gris, Musée du Vieux-Château (Laval) 
 Marée montante à Larmor, dessin, Département des Arts graphiques du Louvre
 Vue du quai Fleurquin à Douai, Musée de la Chartreuse de Douai
 Chemin de Bas-fort-Blanc, Musée de Morlaix
 La grève de Lohic et de l'île de la Souris près de Lorient, Musée d'Orsay
 Bateau échoué sur une plage de Larmor (1877)
 Village de Larmor (1878)
 Larmor-Plage (1879)
 Ramassage du goémon sur le rivage
 Marée basse, Dieppe (1885)
 Marée basse à Portivy

Bibliography 
 François Lotz, "Louise Madeleine Élodie La Villette", in Nouveau dictionnaire de biographie alsacienne, vol. 23, p. 2257

References 

Clara Erskine Clement Waters, Women in the Fine Arts, 1904, p. 206
 
 

1917 deaths
1848 births
French women painters
19th-century French painters
Artists from Strasbourg
19th-century French women artists